Scott McKay (born December 2, 1960) is a Canadian politician, who served as a former leader of the Green Party of Quebec and a former Montreal council member.  McKay was elected in 2008 to the Quebec National Assembly for the Parti Québécois but he was defeated in the 2014 Quebec election.

Background
McKay was born to a francophone mother and an Irish-anglophone father in the town of Montréal-Est.  He has completed a M.Sc. in Environmental sciences at the Université du Québec à Montréal and is currently working in the field of water treatment. He also obtained a bachelor's degree in sciences at the UQAM in 1987.

Municipal politics
In 1986, he was elected to Montreal's City Council as candidate of Jean Doré's Rassemblement des citoyens et citoyennes de Montréal (RCM) for the district of Honoré-Beaugrand.  He was re-elected in 1990, but lost to Ivon Le Duc in 1994 as Pierre Bourque became mayor.

Provincial politics
McKay became leader of the Green Party of Quebec on May 28, 2006.  The party ran candidates in 108 out of Quebec's 125 districts in 2007.  None of them was elected.  McKay himself finished fourth in the district of Bourget with 2,632 ballots and about 8.09% of the vote. The winner was Diane Lemieux of the Parti Québécois.

McKay lost the party leadership at a convention held in Trois-Rivières on March 29, 2008.  Guy Rainville had won a mail-in vote with 268 ballots (54%) against McKay's 225.  Nonetheless, McKay was the Green candidate in the by-election that was called as a result of Lemieux's resignation in the district of Bourget.

Switch to the Parti Québécois
McKay switched parties to run for the Parti Québécois in the 2008 Quebec election, in the riding of L'Assomption.

On December 8, 2008, he was elected as an MNA for the PQ in the riding of L'Assomption.  Due to riding redistribution, McKay ran in the new riding of Repentigny in the 2012 Quebec election and won.  Eighteen months later, McKay was defeated by Coalition Avenir Québec candidate Lise Lavallée in the 2014 Quebec election.

See also 
List of Green party leaders in Canada

Electoral record (partial)

References

External links
 
 Parti Quebecois biopage 

    

1960 births
Quebec people of Irish descent
French Quebecers
Leaders of the Green Party of Quebec
Living people
Montreal city councillors
Parti Québécois MNAs
Quebec political party leaders
Quebecers of French descent
Université du Québec à Montréal alumni
21st-century Canadian politicians